Mario Omar Burke (born 18 March 1997) is a Barbadian sprinter. He currently attends the University of Houston. Burke won a bronze medal in the 100 metres at 2016 World Junior Championships in Athletics. On June 24, 2017, Burke won the 100 metres race at the Barbados National Championships.

He opened his 2019 season with a world-leading time of 6.56 seconds in the 60 meters at the Red Raider Invite meet. He went on to place second over the same distance at the NCAA Division I Indoor Championships with a new personal best time of 6.55 s.

On June 5, 2019, at the NCAA Division I Championships, he became the second Barbadian to break the 10-second barrier with a legal time of 9.98 s. He had previously broken the 10-second barrier with a 9.95 s clocking at the American Athletic Conference Championships a few weeks earlier, but the race was wind-assisted.

Statistics
Information from IAAF profile or Track & Field Results Reporting System unless otherwise noted.

Personal bests

100 m seasonal bests

International championship results

National championship results

Notes

References

External links

Mario Burke bio at Houston Cougars

1997 births
Living people
Sportspeople from Bridgetown
Barbadian male sprinters
Houston Cougars men's track and field athletes
Athletes (track and field) at the 2015 Pan American Games
Athletes (track and field) at the 2019 Pan American Games
Pan American Games competitors for Barbados
World Athletics Championships athletes for Barbados
Central American and Caribbean Games gold medalists for Barbados
Competitors at the 2018 Central American and Caribbean Games
Central American and Caribbean Games medalists in athletics
Athletes (track and field) at the 2020 Summer Olympics
Olympic athletes of Barbados